Gamze Tazim (born 28 January 1989) is a Turkish-Dutch actress.

Filmography

Film

Television

References

External links

1989 births
Living people
Dutch film actresses
Dutch television actresses
Turkish film actresses
Turkish television actresses
Dutch people of Turkish descent
Actresses from The Hague